Semelai may be,

Semelai people
Semelai language

See also
Cychrus semelai, a species of beetle

Language and nationality disambiguation pages